Cry for the Moon may refer to:

Music
"Cry for the Moon" (song), a 1993 song by Mari Hamada
"Cry for the Moon" (Epica song), a 2003 demo and 2004 single by Epica
 "Cry for the Moon", a song written by Hirō Ooyagi, recorded by Tokio on Advance/Mata Asa ga Kuru in 2010
 "Cry for the Moon", a song written by Hirotaka Izumi, recorded by T-Square on Stars and the Moon in 1984

Literature
 Cry for the Moon, a 1988 novel by Anne Stuart
 Cry for the Moon, a 1970 play by Betty Quin